Imre Zachár (May 11, 1890 in Budapest – April 7, 1954 in Budapest) was a Hungarian water polo player and freestyle swimmer who competed at the 1908 Summer Olympics and 1912 Summer Olympics.

Swimming career
He was a member of the Hungarian 1908 Summer Olympics 4x200 metre freestyle relay team that received a silver medal, as well as a member of the Hungarian 4x200 metre freestyle relay team at the 1912 Summer Olympics, which qualified for the final, but did not compete. Zachár was also a member of the Hungarian water polo team which competed in the 1912 tournament.

See also
List of select Jewish swimmers

References

External links
 profile

1890 births
1954 deaths
Sportspeople from Budapest
Hungarian male water polo players
Hungarian male swimmers
Hungarian Jews
Jewish swimmers
Water polo players at the 1912 Summer Olympics
Swimmers at the 1908 Summer Olympics
Swimmers at the 1912 Summer Olympics
Olympic water polo players of Hungary
Olympic swimmers of Hungary
Olympic silver medalists for Hungary
Hungarian male freestyle swimmers
Medalists at the 1908 Summer Olympics
Olympic silver medalists in swimming